Acyl-coenzyme A synthetase short-chain family member 2 is an enzyme that in humans is encoded by the ACSS2 gene.

Function 

This gene encodes a cytosolic enzyme that catalyzes the activation of acetate for use in lipid synthesis and energy generation. The protein acts as a monomer and produces acetyl-CoA from acetate in a reaction that requires ATP. It is also essential for the production of Crotonyl-CoA which activates its target genes by crotonylation of histone tails. Expression of this gene is regulated by sterol regulatory element-binding proteins, transcription factors that activate genes required for the synthesis of cholesterol and unsaturated fatty acids. Two transcript variants encoding different isoforms have been found for this gene.

Metabolic production of acetyl-CoA is linked to histone acetylation and gene regulation. In mouse neurons, Mews et al. identified a major role for the ACSS2 pathway to regulate histone acetylation and neuronal gene expression. Histone acetylation in mature neurons is associated strongly with memory formation. Chromatin becomes acetylated in specific regions of the brain, such as the hippocampus, in response to neuronal activity or behavioral training in rodent. Such acetylation correlates with the increased expression of a set of 'immediate early' genes, which encode proteins that broadly mediate changes in the strength of connections between neurons, therefore facilitating memory consolidation. In the mouse hippocampus, ACSS2 binds directly to immediate early genes to 'fuel' local histone acetylation and, in turn, their induction for long-term spatial memory.

References 
  
11. Sabari BR, Tang Z, Huang H, Yong-Gonzalez V, Molina H, Kong HE, Dai L, Shimada M, Cross JR, Zhao Y, Roeder RG, Allis CD(2015). Intracellular crotonyl-CoA stimulates transcription through p300-catalyzed histone crotonylation. Mol Cell. 58(2):203-15

External links

Further reading 

 
 

Human proteins